Mount Eisen is a  double summit mountain located on the Great Western Divide of the Sierra Nevada mountain range, in Tulare County of northern California. Mount Eisen ranks as the 380th highest summit in California. The summit can be reached from the southeast ridge via a long  hike from Black Rock Pass.

History
This mountain was named by the National Park Service, and officially adopted in 1941 by the United States Board on Geographic Names to remember Gustav Eisen (1847–1940), scientist and early conservationist, who played an important role in the establishment of Sequoia National Park. He was a Sierra Club member for 48 years, and his ashes are interred on the north side of the mountain near Redwood Meadow. The first ascent of the summit was made July 15, 1949, by Howard Parker, Mildred Jentsch, Ralph Youngberg, and Martha Ann McDuffie.

Climate
According to the Köppen climate classification system, Mount Eisen is located in an alpine climate zone. Most weather fronts originate in the Pacific Ocean, and travel east toward the Sierra Nevada mountains. As fronts approach, they are forced upward by the peaks, causing them to drop their moisture in the form of rain or snowfall onto the range (orographic lift). Precipitation runoff from the mountain drains west into tributaries of Kaweah River, and east to Big Arroyo, which is a tributary of the Kern River.

Gallery

See also

 List of mountain peaks of California

References

External links

 Weather forecast: Mount Eisen
 Gustav Eisen photo and biography

Mountains of Tulare County, California
Mountains of Sequoia National Park
North American 3000 m summits
Mountains of Northern California
Sierra Nevada (United States)